Mikhail Leonidovich Lavrovsky (born 29 October 1941) is a Russian former principal dancer of the Bolshoi Ballet.

Biography
Lavrovsky was born on 29 October 1941 in Tbilisi, Georgian Soviet Socialist Republic, USSR, to a family of respected dancers. His father, Leonid Lavrovsky, was a well-known choreographer, while his mother, Elena Chikvaidze, was a ballerina. Three years later, Yuri Grigorovich, a well-known choreographer and teacher, arrived at the Bolshoi. He gave Lavrovsky the role of the prince in The Nutcracker, and later on Lavrovsky appeared in such roles as Ferkhad in Legend of Love, as well as in Spartacus for which he won the Lenin Prize.

In 1977 he was promoted to principal dancer and became a choreographer at the Tbilisi Ballet. The same year, he was awarded the State Prize and was appointed as an artistic director of the Paliashvili Theatre from 1983 to 1985. Prior to that, in 1980, he became a ballet master after graduating from the Russian Academy of Theatre Arts, where he served till 1988. In 2001, Ballet Magazine awarded him their Soul of the Dance award.

References

1941 births
Living people
Russian male ballet dancers
Male dancers from Tbilisi
Lenin Prize winners
Recipients of the Vasilyev Brothers State Prize of the RSFSR
20th-century Russian ballet dancers